The General Commissariat of Information (CGI) is an intelligence service within the National Police Corps of Spain responsible for the collection, analysis and distribution of information relevant to domestic security, as well as its exploitation or operational use, especially in matters of counterterrorism, both nationally and internationally.

It is colloquially named secret police, though in Spain the name of secret police is usually used to any police officer in plainclothes.

History
The General Commissariat of Information was created in November 1912 along with the Directorate-General for Security (currently Directorate-General of the Police) as a "center where all the data and information from the national territory flows, related to the maintenance of general order and the prevention and prosecution of crimes (...)".

In 1939 it was renamed as General Commissariat of Information. According to the agreements of the Council of Ministers, this service has the rank of secret, and his structure, budget, resources, procedures and agents can not be revealed.

TEDAX

From the General Commissariat of Information depends the special unit called TEDAX-NRBQ. TEDAX is the Spanish name for the units trained in bomb disposal.

See also
 Civil Guard Information Service (Civil Guard counterpart)
 General Commissariat of Judiciary Police
 Spanish Intelligence Community
 National Intelligence Center

References

1912 establishments in Spain
Government agencies established in 1912
National law enforcement agencies of Spain
Spanish intelligence agencies
Government agencies of Spain